Franco Ceccuzzi (born 9 February 1967 in Montepulciano) is an Italian politician.

He was elected for the coalition L'Ulivo at the 2006 Italian general election, serving as member of the Chamber of Deputies for two legislatures (XV, XVI). He has been a member of the Democratic Party since 2007.

Ceccuzzi was elected Mayor of Siena on 18 May 2011. He resigned in May 2012 after an internal government crisis and was removed from office on 12 June 2012.

References

See also
2006 Italian general election
2008 Italian general election
2011 Italian local elections
List of mayors of Siena

1967 births
Living people
Mayors of Siena
Democratic Party (Italy) politicians
Democrats of the Left politicians
Deputies of Legislature XV of Italy
Deputies of Legislature XVI of Italy